Nový Šaumburk, also called Zubříč, is a ruined castle in the municipality of Podhradní Lhota in the Zlín Region of the Czech Republic. It is protected as a cultural monument, which was conferred in 1958.

See also
List of castles in the Zlín Region

References

External links
 Nový Šaumburk at hrady.cz

Castles in the Zlín Region
Ruined castles in the Czech Republic